Oling is a hamlet  in the province of Groningen, in the Netherlands.

Oling used to be located in the (former) municipality of Appingedam, but has been a part of the new municipality of Eemsdelta after a municipal reclassification in 2021.

Oling is very scarcely populated, presumably less than 25 people are living in this tiny settlement west of Appingedam.

Geography 

Distance
Within less than two kilometers of Oling are Garreweer (1.1 km), Tjamsweer (1.1 km), and Appingedam (1.9 km), all in the province of Groningen.

See also
 List of cities, towns and villages in Groningen

References

Populated places in Groningen (province)
Eemsdelta